Srinivasa Ramanujan Concept School is a day and residential CBSE school in Hanamkonda, Warangal District of Telangana state, India. The school opened in June 2005. It is operated by Sri Venkateshwara and the Srinivasa Ramanujan Educational Society.

Name
The school is named for Srinivasa Ramanujan, a notable Indian mathematician, recognized in many Indian secondary schools.

See also
Education in India
List of schools in India
List of institutions of higher education in Telangana

References

External links
 

2005 establishments in Andhra Pradesh
High schools and secondary schools in Telangana